Yalınca can refer to:

 Yalınca, Beşiri
 Yalınca, Erzincan